Gergely is a Hungarian given name and surname meaning Gregory (given name) and Gregory (surname), it may refer to:

Gábor Gergely (born 1953), male former table tennis player from Hungary
Gergely András Molnár (1897–2006), at age 108, the last Hungarian World War I veteran
Gergely Balázs (born 1982), Hungarian football (forward) player
Gergely Berzeviczy (1763–1822), important political economist in the Kingdom of Hungary
Gergely Bogányi (born 1974), pianist and winner of the Kossuth Prize
Gergely Bornemissza (1526–1555), Hungarian soldier and national hero
Gergely Boros, Hungarian sprint canoeist who has competed since the late 2000s
Gergely Csiky (1842–1891), Hungarian dramatist
Gergely Délczeg (born 1987), Hungarian professional footballer
Gergely Fűzfa (born 1988), Hungarian football player
Gergely Gyertyános, Hungarian sprint canoeist who has competed since the mid-2000s
Gergely Harsányi (born 1981), Hungarian handballer
Gergely Horváth (born 1975), retired male javelin thrower from Hungary
Gergely Karácsony (born 1975),  Hungarian political scientist, politician
Gergely Kiss (born 1977), Hungarian water polo player
Gergely Kocsárdi (born 1975), Hungarian football player
Gergely Kulcsár (1934–2020), Hungarian athlete, who competed in the javelin throw
Gergely Luthár (1841–1925), Slovene landowner, notar and writer in Hungary
Gergely Palágyi (born 1979), Hungarian hurdler who specializes in the 110 metres hurdles
Gergely Pongrátz (1932–2005), famous veteran of the Hungarian Revolution of 1956
Gergely Rudolf (born 1985), Hungarian football player
Gergely Rusvay (born 1978), Hungarian football player
Gergely Sárközy, Hungarian musician who plays guitar, lute, lute-harpsichord, viola bastarda, and organ
Gergely Salim, Hungarian-Danish taekwondo practitioner
István Gergely (born 1976), Hungarian water polo player
Marc Gergely, Democratic Party member of the Pennsylvania House of Representatives
Matt Gergely, Democratic Party member of the Pennsylvania House of Representatives
Peter Gergely (born 1964), former football player from Slovakia
Tibor Gergely (1900–1978), artist best known for his work in several popular children's books
Vasile Gergely (born 1941), Romanian former football player

See also
Berzeviczy Gergely School of Trade and Catering, situated in Miskolc, one of the oldest schools in Hungary
Gergely Csíky Theatre, theatre in Kaposvár, Hungary

Hungarian masculine given names
Hungarian-language surnames